Nenad Kovačević (born 11 November 1980) is a Serbian former professional footballer who played as a defensive midfielder. He made 25 appearances the Serbia national team. He works as a head coach in the Serbian League Belgrade side FK Sopot.

Career statistics

International

Honours

Club

Red Star Belgrade
Serbian SuperLiga: 2003–04, 2005–06
Serbian Cup: 2003–04, 2005–06

Lens
Ligue 2: 2008–09

References

External links
 
 Nenad Kovačević profile at Reprezentacija.rs
 Nenad Kovačević Stats at Utakmica.rs

1980 births
Living people
Sportspeople from Kraljevo
Association football midfielders
Serbian footballers
Serbia and Montenegro footballers
Serbia and Montenegro international footballers
Serbia international footballers
FK Sloga Kraljevo players
FK Borac Čačak players
Red Star Belgrade footballers
RC Lens players
FC Baku players
FC UTA Arad players
Serbian SuperLiga players
Ligue 1 players
Ligue 2 players
Serbian expatriate footballers
Expatriate footballers in France
Expatriate footballers in Azerbaijan
Serbian expatriate sportspeople in France
Serbian expatriate sportspeople in Azerbaijan
Serbian expatriate sportspeople in Romania
Expatriate footballers in Romania